The Mapuche uprising of 1723 was a rebellion of the Mapuche (an indigenous people of western South America) against the Spanish Empire and its colonial administration in present-day Chile. It began with the killing of Pascual Delgado by Mapuches and continued until Mapuche factions begun to sue for peace in 1725. The Spanish reinforced the fort of Purén, and most of the Spanish managed to find refuge in the various forts without being intercepted or harassed by Mapuches. On August Mapuche toki Vilumilla pushed north occupying Isla del Laja, that is the lands between Bío Bío and Laja rivers. The Spanish led by Manuel de Salamanca attacked a Mapuche encampment of warriors August 24, a day of heavy rain. The Mapuche initially fought with tenacity but came to believe they were being surrounded so they fled the scene. 

Eventually, peace was established by treaty again on February 13, 1726  in the Parliament of Negrete.

References

Bibliography 

1723 Mapuche
Rebellions in Chile
Mapuche uprising
Mapuche uprising
Indigenous rebellions against the Spanish Empire